Wath is a small hamlet in the Ryedale district of North Yorkshire, England. Limestone is quarried here which in the 1950s was in demand by the steel industry for lining the furnaces.

In the late 19th century there were only two houses, later just one farm. The population in 1880 was 11 persons, increasing to 20 in 1914 and decreasing to six in 1950. Until 1866 the place was considered a township, then a civil parish, and later became part of the Hovingham parish.

The farm on the northern side of the road is now used as business premises by a fabric store.

The abandoned Wath Old Quarry is an important site for the study of the stratigraphy and the fauna of the Upper Jurassic of the Cleveland Basin.

References

Hamlets in North Yorkshire
Former civil parishes in North Yorkshire
Hovingham